Rubus iniens is a North American species of flowering plants in the rose family. It has been found only in the States of Virginia and Delaware in the east-central United States.

The genetics of Rubus is extremely complex, so that it is difficult to decide on which groups should be recognized as species. There are many rare species with limited ranges such as this. Further study is suggested to clarify the taxonomy.

References

iniens
Plants described in 1943
Flora of Delaware
Flora of Virginia